Tomark s.r.o. is a Slovak aircraft manufacturer based in Prešov and founded in 1995. The company specializes in the design and manufacture of ready-to-fly ultralight aircraft.

The company is a Společnost s ručením omezeným (sro), a Slovak private limited company. It was started as a mechanical engineering company working in such industries as automotive production and has a division, TomarkAero that produces the aircraft designs.

The company's first design is the Tomark Viper SD4, a low-wing, two seat aircraft that was first flown on 1 November 2006 and accepted by the American Federal Aviation Administration as an approved special light-sport aircraft in 2010.

The second design, the Tomark Skyper GT9, is a high-wing, two seat ultralight, designed for flight training and touring, introduced in 2014. It was designed for the Fédération Aéronautique Internationale microlight rules and US light-sport aircraft rules and complies with the Czech UL2-1 and ELSA as well as German LTF-UL rules.

Aircraft 
Summary of aircraft built by Tomark:

Tomark Viper SD4 - introduced 2007
Tomark Skyper GT9 - introduced 2014

References

External links

Aircraft manufacturers of Slovakia
Ultralight aircraft
Light-sport aircraft
Manufacturing companies established in 1995
Slovakian companies established in 1995